The Turkey national football B team, also known as the Turkey A2 national football team is a reserve team for the Turkey national football team. It features players from the A2 Ligi. The team played their first match in 2002 at the 2003 Future Cup. They have played 23 matches, winning eleven, drawing eight, and losing four. The team is currently coached by Gökhan Keskin.

History
The A2 team was seldom used from the foundation in 2002 until 2008. 

When Guus Hiddink took over the senior squad, he re-introduced the reserve squad. The team came together for their first camp in Istanbul in November 2010. The team played their first matches against Belarus in February 2011.

The team participated in the 2012 Toulon Tournament from 23 May to 1 June. They finished in second place after losing the final to Mexico. They also won the 2011–13 International Challenge Trophy.

At the 2013 Islamic Solidarity Games in Palembang, Indonesia, the team took the bronze medal defeating the squad of Saudi Arabia 2-1.

Results and statistics

Olympic Games

Mediterranean Games

Most appearances and goals
Appearances

Goals

Squads

Current squad
The squad as of 11 September 2013, which participated at the 3rd Islamic Solidarity Games in Palembang, Indonesia from 22 September to 1 October 2013.

Coach: Ersoy Sandalcı

Honours
International Challenge Trophy: 2011–13
Future Team Cup: 2002–03, 2004–05

References 

A2-team
European national B association football teams
A2 Ligi